Sous lieutenant Marcel Pierre Viallet (21 August 1887–21 September 1925) was a French World War I flying ace credited with nine aerial victories. Postwar, he would serve in the Rif War in Morocco, dying there of disease.

Early life

Marcel Pierre Viallet was born in Lyon, France, on 21 August 1887. Viallet traveled in his youth, but returned home to France as World War I began.

World War I service

Viallet immediately joined the cavalry, but was seriously wounded in late 1914. While in hospital, he applied for a transfer to aviation. On 23 February 1915, he started training; on 12 November, he received Military Pilot's Brevet No. 2533. He then served as a test pilot on Caudrons. From there, he was assigned to Escadrille 53, having already logged 376 flight hours. On 28 April 1916, he scored his first win, over a Fokker Eindekker. Two days later, he flew a successful escort mission despite having his controls cut. A Médaille militaire followed, on 22 May 1916.

In June 1916, he was reassigned to a Nieuport unit, Escadrille N.67. He would run up eight more victories there, including one shared with Georges Flachaire.

Postwar, he remained in the military. He became ill during the Rif War in Morocco, and died on 21 September 1925.

Honors and awards

Médaille militaire

"Marechal-des-Logis of the Escadrille C53. A pilot of great value who always shows his courage, audacity and sang-froid. On 28 April 1916, returning from a reconnaissance over German lines, from close in he attacked a German plane which was seen to fall disabled. On 30 April [1916] he resolutely attacked an enemy scout in order to ward it away from an airplane he was protecting. Having had his controls cut, he succeeded after a fall of 2,000 meters to stabilize his plane and save his observer."
 
Légion d'honneur

"Marechal-des-Logis pilot of Escadrille N67, wounded twice in the cavalry, requested a transfer to aviation where he has become a pilot of the highest order, of remarkable strength and exceptional audacity. Already has the Médaille Militaire for downing two enemy planes, under particularly difficult circumstances, in March and April 1916; on 6 August [1916] he succeeded during the course of the same flight to down two other German planes sequentially one behind our lines the other near the trenches."

He also won the Croix de guerre.

Sources of information

References
 Nieuport Aces of World War 1. Norman Franks. Osprey Publishing, 2000. , .
 Over the Front: A Complete Record of the Fighter Aces and Units of the United States and French Air Services, 1914-1918. Norman L. R. Franks, Frank W. Bailey. Grub Street, 1992. , .

1887 births
1925 deaths
French World War I flying aces
People of the Rif War